is a 1967 Japanese-Italian film directed by Kon Ichikawa.

References

External links

Japanese animated films
Italian animated films
Films directed by Kon Ichikawa
Films with screenplays by Kon Ichikawa
1960s Japanese films
1960s Italian films